The Lagos State Fire Service is the statutory fire and rescue service for Lagos State. 

Established in 1972 by the Lagos State Law Cap.42 of 1972, it is primarily tasked with managing fire emergencies in Lagos State. The service is responsible for fire protection and community safety among residents and visitors across the state. 

The Lagos State Fire Service was established on August 31, 1972, with an Expatriate Chief Fire Officer, Sir Allan Flemming, as the first Chief Fire Officer with a three-man crew.

In 2021, Governor Babajide Sanwo-Olu appointed Mrs Margaret Adeseye, Director of the Lagos State Fire and Rescue Service.

The Lagos State Fire Service employs 553 operational personnel, including 9 non-uniformed personnel in various fields.

Activities 
The fire and rescue service was upgraded to an agency status during Governor Babajide Sanwo-Olu's administration, in pursuance of Mr Sanwo-Olu’s THEMES Agenda. The officers and men of the agency are highly trained, disciplined and professional enough about handling their responsibilities. The agency have modern and functioning appliances at their disposal.

Apart from the continuous training of its personnel, the Agency Under Adeseye recruited 100 firemen in 2020 to boost its staff strength in order to enhance its operations. Mrs. Adeseye Margaret prioritized the personnel welfare since she assumed office. It is not surprising that under her leadership, the Service has received several appreciation and commendation letters from corporate organizations and private individuals.

Vision 
To ensure fast response to fire calls, rescue operations, and other related emergencies, as well as proactive fire prevention measures and training.

Mission 
To provide effective service delivery in fire prevention and attack with the goal of minimizing deaths, injuries, and economic losses caused by fire to a bare minimum.

Stations
Headquartered in Alausa, the service currently has a total of 16 fire stations across Lagos State. The stations can be found in:
Alausa
Agege
Badagry
lekki-phase I
lekki-phase II
Epe
Sari-Iganmu
Ikeja
Ikotun
Ikorodu
Ilupeju
Isolo
Ojo
Ejigbo
Abesan
Bolade

References

Firefighting in Lagos State
Fire Service
Organizations based in Lagos
Fire departments of Nigeria
Rescue agencies

Fire and rescue services of Lagos State
Government agencies established in 1972
1972 establishments in Nigeria